The Mother of Virtues is the second studio album by Pyrrhon, released on April 1, 2014 by Relapse Records.

Track listing

Personnel
Adapted from The Mother of Virtues liner notes.

Pyrrhon
 Alex Cohen – drums
 Dylan DiLella – electric guitar
 Erik Malave – bass guitar
 Doug Moore – vocals

Production and additional personnel
 Caroline Harrison – cover art, design
 Ryan Jones – recording, mixing
 Colin Marston – mastering

Release history

References

External links 
 
 The Mother of Virtues at Bandcamp

2014 albums
Pyrrhon (band) albums
Relapse Records albums